Chahbar or Chah Bahar is a city in Sistan and Balochistan Province of Iran.

Chahbar may also refer to:
 Chah Bar, Markazi, Iran
 Chahbar, Qazvin, Iran